Manuel García y Rodríguez (1863, Seville - 6 May 1925, Seville) was a Spanish costumbrista and landscape painter, who also painted Orientalist scenes.

Biography 

At first, he studied music but ultimately dedicated himself to his love of painting. He received his earliest art education from José de la Vega Marrugal in Seville.

Throughout his life, he participated in the National Exhibition of Fine Arts, where he was awarded medals in 1887, 1890 and 1895. He also participated in the Exposition Universelle (1889) and the World's Columbian Exposition. In 1899, he was named a member of the Real Academia de Bellas Artes de San Fernando.

In 1904, he visited Tangier and produced some paintings in Orientalist style. His works are in numerous museums (including the Carmen Thyssen Museum) and private collections. He was also a regular contributor of illustrations for the magazine Blanco y Negro.

He took much of his inspiration from the city of Seville and the Guadalquivir, including the Guadaira rivers and surrounding areas. He was closely associated with the Alcalá de Guadaira school of painting. In his final years, he focussed on the gardens, patios and parks of Seville, at which time he developed more of a modernist and impressionist aesthetic.

Work
García's work remains well-known because many of his landscapes were reproduced as black and white illustrations, postcards and posters.  Example of his work can be found in the Museum of Fine Arts in Seville. Many of his paintings are now in private collections, such as the Bellver Collection.

List of selected paintings

 A Morning Stroll by the Canal, 1904
 Patio with Children, 1906
 Alcazar de Sevilla, 1911
 A River Landscape with Seville Beyond, 1912
 A Garden in Seville, 1913
 Seville Garden, 1914
 The Borders of Guadalquivir, 1917
 A Garden in Seville, 1919
 Collecion Bay, Madrid, 1921
 The Rose Garden, 1921 
 Seville Patio, 1925
 At the Well
 A Courtyard in Seville
 Easter Procession in Mateos Gago Street, Seville
 Feeding Poultry in a Courtyard
 The Gardens of the Alcazar of Seville
 Mother and Daughter Sewing in a Patio 
 Mujer con guitarra, (Woman with Guitar)
  Musician in an Andalusian Palace 
 Inside Courtyard, Seville
 Street scene in Granada

Gallery

See also
 List of Orientalist artists
 Orientalism

References

External links

ArtNet: More works by García.

1863 births
1925 deaths
19th-century Spanish painters
19th-century Spanish male artists
Spanish male painters
20th-century Spanish painters
20th-century Spanish male artists
Orientalist painters